Geraldine Smith may refer to:

 Geraldine Smith (politician) (born 1961), British politician
 Geraldine Smith (actress) (born 1949), American actress